Cithaerias pireta, the blushing phantom, is a species of butterfly of the family Nymphalidae. It is found from Mexico south to South America.

Subspecies
Cithaerias pireta pireta (Mexico to Colombia, Ecuador)
Cithaerias pireta aurorina (Weymer, 1910) (Columbia, Brazil (Amazonas))
Cithaerias pireta aura (Langer, 1943) (Brazil (Amazonas, Acre))
Cithaerias pireta aurora (C. & R. Felder, 1862) (Peru)
Cithaerias pireta magdalenensis Constantino, 1995 (Colombia)
Cithaerias pireta tambopata Lamas, 1998 (Peru)

References

Butterflies described in 1780
Haeterini
Butterflies of North America
Butterflies of Central America
Nymphalidae of South America
Taxa named by Caspar Stoll